Seyfert is a surname, and may refer to:

Carl Keenan Seyfert (1911–1960), United States astronomer 
Gabriele Seyfert (born 1948), German athlete in figure skating
J. Michael Seyfert (born 1959), German Mexican documentary filmmaker, photographer
Johann Caspar Seyfert (1697–1767), German music composer
 (1731–1772), German music composer, son of Johann Caspar Seyfert
R. Tracy Seyfert (born 1941), United States political figure from Pennsylvania

Other uses
Seyfert (crater), a crater on the far side of Earth's Moon that is named after Carl Keenan Seyfert
Seyfert Galaxy, a class of galaxies named after Carl Keenan Seyfert
Seyfert's Sextet, a group of galaxies located in a cluster some 190 million light-years from Earth

See also
 Seifert, surname
 Seiffert, surname
 Siefert, surname